Holger Gaißmayer (born 2 July 1970) is a German former professional footballer who played as a forward. He played for 1. FC Köln, Rot-Weiß Oberhausen, Kickers Offenbach and LR Ahlen in Bundesliga and 2. Bundesliga.

References

External links
 

1970 births
Living people
Footballers from Essen
German footballers
Association football forwards
Bundesliga players
2. Bundesliga players
Rot-Weiß Oberhausen players
1. FC Köln players
Kickers Offenbach players
Rot Weiss Ahlen players